The 1873–74 Scottish Cup – officially the Scottish Football Association Challenge Cup – was the first season of Scotland's most prestigious football knockout competition. A total of 16 teams from the west of Scotland entered the competition, however only 14 would play a match after two withdrawals. The competition began with the first match between Renton and Kilmarnock on 18 October 1873 and concluded with the final on 21 March 1874. After 16 matches and 38 goals, the inaugural cup was won by Queen's Park who defeated fellow Glasgow club Clydesdale 2–0 in the final.

The 16 teams that entered the competition consisted of the eight founder members of the Scottish FA – namely Clydesdale, Dumbreck, Eastern, Granville, Kilmarnock, Queen's Park, Vale of Leven and 3rd Lanark RV – as well as Alexandra Athletic, Blythswood, Callander, Dumbarton, Renton, Rovers, Southern and Western. Subscription fees from 15 of these clubs were used to pay for the Scottish Cup trophy which the teams would compete for. Unlike the FA Cup, the original trophy is still awarded to the winners of the competition. It is the oldest in association football and the oldest national trophy in the world.

Background
Queen's Park had been founded in July 1867 and joined the English Football Association three years later. They had contributed to the cost of the FA Cup trophy and entered the competition in its inaugural season. However, the costs of travelling to England for matches was prohibitive. In both 1872 and 1873, they were forced to withdraw from the competition in the semi-finals.

In March 1873, the club took out an advertisement in a Glasgow newspaper to invite football clubs to a meeting in the Dewar's Hotel with the intention of discussing the formation of a football association for Scotland. Secretary Archibald Rae also wrote a letter to a number of clubs, including Kilmarnock who had taken influence from Queen's Park to play association football over rugby, to invite them to the meeting. Committee members from Queen's Park were joined by representatives from six other clubs – Clydesdale, Vale of Leven, Dumbreck, 3rd Lanark RV, Eastern and Granville – at the meeting and a letter of support was received from Kilmarnock who were unable to attend. The eight clubs agreed to establish the Scottish Football Association and resolved that:

Eight further teams joined the Scottish FA over the next few months and subscription fees from 15 of them were used to pay for the trophy. The Scottish Cup is the oldest trophy in association football and it has been awarded to the winner of every edition of the competition.

Format

As 16 teams entered the competition, the first edition of the Scottish Cup took on the format of a straightforward knockout tournament. In future years, the number of entrants would expand to regularly include over 100 teams which resulted in the need for byes before the introduction of the Scottish Football League in 1890 and the Scottish Qualifying Cup in 1895.

For the first round, the names of the 16 teams were placed into a single lot and drawn into pairs. The home team for each tie was determined by the toss of a coin unless it was mutually agreed or only one of the two clubs drawn against one another had a private ground. In the event of a draw, the team who lost the toss would have the choice of ground for the replay. This process was repeated for the quarter-finals and semi-finals. The choice of venue for the final matches was reserved to the Scottish FA.

Rules
The inaugural competition was played according to the rules of The Football Association, known as the Laws of the Game. Pitches could be no more than 200 yards by 100 yards and goals were marked by two upright posts at either end, 8 yards apart, with tape between them at 8ft high. A coin toss decided the ends each team would shoot towards and which team kicked off. A goal was scored when the ball passed between the posts below the tape and ends were changed after each goal was scored. Players were considered "out of play" if they were nearer to the goal than their teammate when they kicked the ball unless there were at least three of their opponents between them and their own goal. Players who were out of play could not touch the ball or prevent any other players from doing so until they were back in play. The rules specifically forbade players from kicking and hacking their opponents as well as from wearing "projecting nails, iron plates or gutta percha" on the soles of their boots.

Teams
All 16 teams entered the competition in the first round. Of the clubs that entered, eight were founder members of the Scottish FA. Those included Clydesdale, Granville, Queen's Park and 3rd Lanark RV from Renfrewshire as well as Dumbreck from Lanarkshire, Eastern from Glasgow, Ayrshire side Kilmarnock and Vale of Leven from Dunbartonshire. A further five Glasgow clubs – Alexandra Athletic, Blythswood, Callander, Rovers, and Western – entered alongside Dumbarton and Renton from Dunbartonshire and Southern from Renfrewshire.

Of the 16 teams to enter the first round; Southern were the only team who would not play a single match and – as of 2022 – only Dumbarton, Kilmarnock and Queen's Park still regularly compete in the competition.

Calendar

First round
At a committee meeting of the Scottish Football Association on 9 October 1873, the first round ties were drawn. Five of the eight ties were played at venues opposite to the draw after Renton, Eastern, Queen's Park, Western and Clydesdale won the coin toss.

The first match took place on 18 October 1873 when Renton defeated Kilmarnock – who played the entire match with 10 players – 2–0 in the first round. The match was played in Crosshill, at the neutral Hampden Park. Newspaper reports from the time suggest Kilmarnock may have been at a disadvantage as they were more used to playing rugby. Later on the same day, Alexandra Athletic and Eastern recorded wins over Callander and Rovers and the following week Queen's Park began the competition with a 7–0 win over Dumbreck in the highest scoring game in the inaugural competition. John McPherson scored the first ever Scottish Cup hat-trick as Clydesdale defeated Granville 6–0 in what would be the latter's only Scottish Cup match and Blythswood won 1–0 away to Western.

Southern and Vale of Leven scratched their first round matches against Dumbarton and 3rd Lanark RV respectively.

Matches

Sources:

Quarter-finals
Two of the four quarter-final ties were played at venues opposite to the draw after Alexandra Athletic and Renton won the coin toss.

The quarter-final stage began on 8 November 1873 when Clydesdale and 3rd Lanark RV drew 1–1 at Kinning Park to set up the first Scottish Cup replay eight days later. This match also finished in a draw meaning a second replay was to be played on 6 December. In the meantime, Dumbarton lost 1–0 to Renton in a replay on 29 November 1873 after the first match had finished goalless a week earlier. According to reports in The Herald, both matches were played on a public park in Renton. Queen's Park and Blythswood reached the semi-finals without the need for a replay as they defeated Eastern and Alexandra Athletic respectively. In the last match of the quarter-final stage, Clydesdale defeated 3rd Lanark RV 2–0 at a neutral venue in their second replay.

Matches

Replays

Second replay

Notes

Sources:

Semi-finals
The two semi-final matches were played a week apart in December 1873. Both ties were played at venues opposite to the draw after Clydesdale and Queen's Park won the coin toss. Queen's Park were the first team to reach the final as they defeated Renton 2–0 at the original Hampden Park on 13 December. Clydesdale then booked their place in the inaugural final a week later as they recorded a 4–0 win over Blythswood at Kinning Park.

Matches

Notes

Sources:

Final

After 15 matches played and 36 goals scored, the tournament culminated in the 1874 Scottish Cup Final on 21 March 1874. The match, played at the original Hampden Park in Crosshill, was watched by 2,500 spectators and refereed by James McIntyre of Eastern. As Hampden Park was the home of finalists Queen's Park, the match was one of a select few cup finals in Scotland that were not played on neutral territory.

Both goals came in the second half courtesy of Scotland internationals Billy MacKinnon and Robert Leckie. Queen's Park won 2–0 to claim the trophy for the first of their 10 triumphs.

See also
1873–74 in Scottish football

References

1873-74
Cup
1873–74 domestic association football cups